The 50 metre team free pistol event was one of the competitions in the Shooting at the 1900 Summer Olympics events in Paris. It was held on 1 August 1900. 20 shooters from 4 nations competed, with five shooters per team.  Medals were given for individual high scores, and the scores of the five shooters were summed to give a team score. The winning team was from Switzerland; silver went to France and the Netherlands took bronze.

Background

This was the first appearance of a team version of what would become (for individuals) standardised as the men's ISSF 50 meter pistol event. The team event was held 4 times, at every Summer Olympics from 1900 to 1920 (except 1904, when no shooting events were held).

Röderer used a Waffenfabrik Bern 1882 Swiss Ordnance Revolver.

Competition format

The competition had each shooter fire 60 shots at a distance of 50 metres. The target was round, 50 centimetres in diameter, with 10 scoring rings. Scoring for each shot was up to 10 points, in increments of 1 point. The maximum individual score possible was 600 points; the maximum team score (sum of five individual scores) was 3000 points.

Revolver must have a barrel of 11 cm in length. Ties were broken by greatest number of shots on target (1 or better), then greatest number in the black (7 or better), then by ring (10, 9, 8, etc.).

Schedule

Results

The scores of the five shooters on each team were summed to give a team score. All scores were taken from the individual event; no further shooting was done. The maximum score was 3000.

References

 International Olympic Committee medal winners database
 De Wael, Herman. Herman's Full Olympians: "Shooting 1900". Accessed 3 March 2006.
 

Men's pistol military, team

ca:Tir als Jocs Olímpics d'estiu de 1900 - Pistola militar
hu:1900. évi nyári olimpiai játékok (sportlövészet - férfi pisztoly)